Chilton Street Mill is a tower mill at Clare, Suffolk, England which is derelict.

History
Chilton Street Mill was erected in 1846. It ceased work when the sails were blown off sometime before the First World War. The mill was stripped of machinery in the late 1920s or early 1930s and stands today as a shell.

Description

Chilton Street Mill is a five storey tower mill. It had a domed cap winded by a fantail. The four Patent sails drove two pairs of millstones.

References

External links
Windmill World webpage on Chilton Street Mill.
Roughwood

Windmills in Suffolk
Tower mills in the United Kingdom
Windmills completed in 1846
Grinding mills in the United Kingdom
Clare, Suffolk